Melissa's Garage Revisited is an album released by Memphis garage-rock band the Oblivians. The album features Austin-based harmonicist Walter Daniels and Memphis-based vocalist Jeffrey Evans. The album was originally released as an EP in 1995 by Texas record label, Undone. When released as an EP, the album was titled Walter Daniels Plays with Monsieur Jeffrey Evans & The Oblivians at Melissa's Garage. For the rerelease, the title was shortened and four new tracks from a '68 Comeback 7" were appended.

Track listing 
It Don't Take Too Much - 3:53
Rockin' in the Graveyard - 2:53
Don't Worry - 2:31
Dearest Darling - 3:46
We're Not in It to Lose - 1:58
(Additional tracks added for rerelease)
Someday My Prince Will Come - 3:22
The Darker the Berry - 2:03
Sticks and Stones - 3:32
Bending Like a Willow Tree - 3:15

Credits
 Greg Oblivian - Guitar, vocals, drums
 Jack Oblivian - Guitar, vocals, drums
 Eric Oblivian - Guitar, vocals, drums
 Monsieur Jeffrey Evans - Guitar, vocals
 Walter Daniels - Harmonica, vocals

References
 Chadbourne, Eugene. [ "Melissa's Garage Revisited"] "www.allmusic.com". Accessed June 1, 2007.
 Evert. "Walter Daniels" "www.grunnenrocks.com". Accessed June 1, 2007.

Oblivians albums